Cerovec pod Bočem ( or ) is a settlement at the southern foothills of Mount Boč in eastern Slovenia. It belongs to the Municipality of Rogaška Slatina. The area belongs to the traditional Styria region and is now included in the Savinja Statistical Region.

Name
The name of the settlement was changed from Cerovec to Cerovec pod Bočem in 1955.

References

External links
Cerovec pod Bočem on Geopedia

Populated places in the Municipality of Rogaška Slatina